Just Another Life is the first live VHS released by Japanese rock duo B'z. It features live footage of the band's early hits.

The concert is the first official "Live Gym" release, although it would take several releases before the "Live Gym" name would be appear.

Track listing 

Lady Navigation
Bad Communication
Loving All Nigh
Oh! Girl
Safety Love
Love Ya
Dakara Sono te wo Hanashite (だからその手を離して)
Taiyou no Komachi Angel (太陽の Komachi Angel)
Kodoku no Runaway (孤独の Runaway)
Pleasure '91
Hot Fashion
Easy Come, Easy go!

External links 
B'z Official Website 

B'z video albums